Note: Not to be confused with the Austro-Hungarian Aviatik B.II series 32, 32.7 and 34 which were different aircraft.

The Aviatik B.II was a reconnaissance aircraft built in Germany during World War I.

Design and development
The (German) Aviatik B.II was a two-seat biplane of conventional configuration that seated its pilot and observer in tandem, open cockpits. Compared to its predecessor, the B.I, the B.II had a more powerful engine and revised nose design that faired the powerplant in more neatly, and a single "rhino horn" collector stack for the exhaust. A variety of two- and three-bay wing designs were utilised during production. While originally no armament was fitted (in common with other B- class aircraft), later production versions received a machine gun for the observer. All were withdrawn from front line service by early 1916, however the type continued in use as a trainer for a time with advanced flying training units (it is known that the B.II served in this role at FEA 9 at Darmstadt during 1916).

Operators

Luftstreitkrafte

Specifications

References

Further reading

External links

 luftfahrt-archiv.de
 Military Aircraft Database

1910s German military reconnaissance aircraft
B.II
Single-engined tractor aircraft
Biplanes
Aircraft first flown in 1915